Rosalyn Boulter  (1 February 19176 March 1997) was a British film actress. She married Stanley Haynes, a film writer, director and producer before having a daughter together, Carol, in 1943.

Between 1935 and 1936 she featured in four West End productions shortly followed by her first 2 film roles, a romantic comedy called Love at Sea (1936) and a thriller called Holiday's End (1937). In 1937, she toured the UK and made her Broadway debut, playing the lead in the West End hit George and Margaret. Boulter died on 6 March 1997 in Santa Barbara, California, United States.

Filmography

References

External links

Rosalyn Boulter biography at the Official George Formby Website

1917 births
1997 deaths
British stage actresses
British film actresses
20th-century British actresses